Padma Kant Shukla (CorrFRSE, FInstP, FAPS, AFTWAS) (7 July 1950 – 26 January 2013) was a distinguished Professor and first International Chair of the Physics and Astronomy Department of Ruhr-University Bochum in Germany. He was also the director of the International Centre for Advanced Studies in Physical Sciences at Ruhr-University Bochum. He held a PhD in physics from Banaras Hindu University in Varanasi, India and a second doctorate in Theoretical Plasma Physics from Umeå University in Sweden.

Personal background
Padma Kant Shukla was born in the village Tulapur (near Chunar district Mirzapur) near Varanasi, Uttar Pradesh, India and was educated there. After his PhD in physics from Banaras Hindu University in Varanasi, India at the age of 22, he moved to Umeå University, Sweden in January 1972, and obtained his second doctorate degree in Theoretical Plasma Physics there in 1975. He has lived in Bochum and worked at Ruhr University Bochum, Germany since January 1973, becoming a German Citizen in 1993. During his marriage life with wife Ranjana Shukla he had three sons.

Educational background
Shukla has received honorary doctorates from the Prasidium of the Russian Academy of Sciences (Moscow) and the Technical University of Lisbon, Portugal. He is a fellow of the American Physical Society, a fellow of the Institute of Physics (UK), and a corresponding fellow of the Royal Society of Edinburgh (Scotland, UK), a foreign member of the Physics Class of the Royal Swedish Academy of Sciences, the Royal Swedish Academy of Engineering Sciences, and an associate fellow/member of the World Academy for the Advancement of Sciences in the Developing World (Trieste, Italy). He has been awarded the 2005 American Physical Society Dweight Nicholson Medal for the Human Outreach through Physics, a 2011 APS Outstanding Referee, and is recipient of the 2006 Gay-Lussac-Humboldt-Prize from the French Ministry of Education and Research. He is the first laureate of the 22nd Khwarizmi International Award from the IROST, Iran.

 1975 PhD in theoretical plasma physics, Umea University, Umea, Sweden
 1972 PhD in physics, Banaras Hindu University, Varanasi, Uttar Pradesh, India
 1969 MSc in physics, Agra University, Agra, Uttar Pradesh, India
 1967 BSc in physics, mathematics & chemistry, Agra University, Agra, Uttar Pradesh, India

Professional background
Shukla has been a faculty member in the Physics and Astronomy Department at Ruhr-University Bochum, Germany since January 1973, where he is a Distinguished Physics Professor and holds an International Chair and Directorship of the International Centre for Advanced Studies in Physical Sciences at Ruhr-University Bochum.

Shukla holds an adjunct professorship of engineering sciences at the Department of Mechanical and Aerospace Engineering, University of California, San Diego, La Jolla, California, USA; an adjunct physics professorship at the Department of Physics & Astronomy, Delhi University, India; visiting professorships at the Department of Physics, Umeå University, Sweden; and at the Scottish Universities Physics Alliance (SUPA) Department of Physics, University of Strathclyde, Glasgow, Scotland (UK). He holds an invited full professorship at GoLP/Centre for Plasma Physics and Nuclear Fusion, Instituto Superior Technico, Technical University 
of Lisbon, Portugal; an honorary professorship at the School of Chemistry and Physics, University of KwaZulu-Natal, Durban, South Africa..

He is a world-renowned theoretical plasma physicist, with wide-ranging research interest in multidisciplinary sciences including basic and nonlinear physics, nonlinear geophysical flows, atmospheric physics and environmental sciences, soft-condensed matter physics and matter wave solitons, high-energy density physics, nonlinear phenomena in quantum systems, plasma astrophysics and neutrino-plasma physics, plasma-based high-energy charged particle acceleration, intense photon-photon and photon-plasma interactions, and fusion physics. He is famous for his international leadership in physical sciences.

He has published extensively (70 review papers and 1450 papers in more than sixty journals, including Nature, Nature Physics, Reviews of Modern Physics, Physical Review Letters, Physical Review, Physics of Plasmas, Physics Letters A, receiving over 21,200 citations, with the Hirsch Index=62) on various aspects of theoretical and computational plasma physics, as well as discovered numerous novel phenomena involving wave-wave and wave-particle interactions in physical sciences.

He has coauthored the textbook, Introduction to Dusty Plasma Physics, and edited or co-edited 15 books and several (18) Special Issues of various journals. He is the discoverer of the dust acoustic wave in dusty plasmas and novel attractive force between ions at atomic dimensions in quantum plasmas. He has more than 30 years of experience in committee work both at national and international levels.

Since 1989, Shukla has been a co-organizer/director of the plasma physics activities (Summer Colleges and Workshops in Plasma Physics) at the Abdus Salam International Centre for Theoretical Physics (AS-ICTP), Trieste (Italy), Chairman of the International Advisory Committee of the International Conference on Physics of Dusty Plasmas (ICPDP), and International Advisory Committee member of the International Congress on Plasma Physics (ICPP). He has presented over 130 keynote, plenary, tutorial, and topical lectures in international conferences, including European Physical Society, American Physical Society, ICPP, ICPDP, Summer Colleges and Workshops at the AS-ICTP.

Shukla has significantly contributed to education, as well as to the development of basic and applied physics worldwide; specifically, in developing countries across the globe. He has served (2008-2011) as Chairman of the International Union of Pure and Applied Physics (IUPAP) C.16 Commission on Plasma Physics, 
and serving (since 2008) as Chairman of the Scientific Council of the Emerging Nations Science Foundation (Trieste, Italy), as Editor-in-Chief of J. Plasma Physics (Cambridge University Press, UK), as editorial board member of Physical Review E (American Physical Society), as associate editor of Physics of Plasmas 
(American Institute of Physics), and as International Advisory Panel of Plasma Physics and Controlled Fusion (Institute of Physics, Bristol, UK). He is reviewer for scientific projects from the US National Science Foundation, US Department of Energy, US NASA, European Science Foundation (ESF), Israeli Science Foundation 
(ISF), British Science Council, and acts as referees for the Alexander von Humboldt Foundation, which awards Fellowships and Prizes. He acts as referees for more than seventy International Physics and Engineering Journals.

Significant publications
P. K. Shukla and B. Eliasson, "Novel attractive force between ions in quantum plasmas", "Phys. Rev. Lett." '"108"', 165007 (2012) (5 pages); Erratum: PRL 108, 219902(E) (2012); PRL 109, 019901 (E) (2012) (1 page).
I. Zeba, M. E. Yahia, P. K. Shukla, W. M. Moslem, Electron–hole two-stream instability in quantum semiconductor plasma with exchange-correlation effects; Physics Letters A 376 (2012) 2309–2313.
P. K. Shukla and B. Eliasson. "Nonlinear collective interactions in quantum plasmas with degenerate electron fluids", "Rev. Mod. Phys." 83, 885-906 (2011). SCI=58 (Source Google Scholar).
P. K. Shukla and K. Avinash. "Phase coexistence and a critical point in ultracold-neutral plasmas", "Phys. Rev. Lett." 107, 135002 (2011) [5 pages].
 P. K. Shukla and B. Eliasson. "Nonlinear aspects of quantum plasma physics", "Uspekhi Fizicheskikh Nauk" 180, 55–82 (2010) [Eng. Translation]: Phys. Usp 53, 51–76 (2010). SCI=159 (Source Google Scholar).
 P. K. Shukla and B. Eliasson. "Fundamentals of dust-plasma interactions", Rev. Mod. Phys. 81, 25–44 (2009). SCI=213 (Source Google Scholar).
 P. K. Shukla. "A new spin in quantum plasmas", Nature Phys. 5, 92–93 (2009). SCI=58 (Source Google SCholar).
 D. Shaikh and P. K. Shukla. "Fluid turbulence in quantum plasmas", Phys. Rev. Lett. 99, 125002 (2007) [4 pages]. SCI=72 (Google Scholar).
 P. K. Shukla and B. Eliasson. "Formation and dynamics of dark solitons and vortices in quantum electron plasmas", Phys. Rev. Lett. 96, 245001 (4pp) (2006). SCI=156 (Source Google Scholar).
 P. K. Shukla, I. Kourakis, B. Eliasson, M. Marklund and L. Stenflo. "Instability and evolution of nonlinearly interacting water waves", Phys. Rev. Lett. 96, 094501 (2006) [4 pages]. SCI=64 (Source Google Scholar).
 B. Eliasson and P. K. Shukla. "Formation and dynamics of coherent structures involving phase-space vortices in plasmas", Phys. Rep. 422, 225–290 (2006). SCI=60 (Source Google Scholar).
 M. Marklund and P. K. Shukla. "Nonlinear collective effects in photon-photon and photon-plasma interactions", Rev. Mod. Phys. 78, 591–640 (2006). SCI=407 (Source Google Scholar).
 D. Sundkvist, V. Krasnoselskikh, P. K. Shukla, A. Vaivdas, M. Andre, S. Buchert and H. Reme. "In situ multi-satellite detection of coherent vortices as a manifestation of Alfvenic turbulence", Nature (London) 436, 825–828 (2005).SCI= 72 (Source Google Scholar).
 D. Jovanovic and P. K. Shukla. "Magnetic reconnection mediated by lower-hybrid, phase-space vortices", Phys. Rev. Lett. 93, 015002 (2004) [4 pages].
P. K. Shukla. "Nonlinear waves and structures in dusty plasmas", "Phys. Plasmas" 10, 1619-1627 (2003). SCI=72.
P. K. Shukla and A. A. Mamun. "Solitons, shocks, and vortices in dusty plasmas", "New J. Phys." 5, 17.1--17.37 (2003). SCI=172 (Source Google Scholar).
 P. K. Shukla and A. A. Mamun. "Introduction to Dusty Plasma Physics", IoP, Bristol, UK (2002). SCI=1250 (Source Google Scholar).
 P. K. Shukla. "A survey of dusty plasma physics", Phys. Plasmas 8, 1791–1803 (2001). SCI=286 (Source Google Scholar).
 P. K. Shukla. "Parametric instability of dust lattice waves in a turbulent plasma sheath", Phys. Rev. Lett. 84, 5328–5330 (2000). SCI=32.
 D. Jovanovic and P. K. Shukla. "Nonlinear model for coherent electric-field structures in the magnetosphere", Phys. Rev. Lett. 84, 4373–4376 (2000). SCI=32.
 Y. Nakamura, H. Bailung and P. K. Shukla. "Observation of ion-acoustic shocks in a dusty plasma", Phys. Rev. Lett. 83, 1602–1605 (1999). SCI=312 (Source Google Scholar).
 P. K. Shukla, R. Bingham, H. A. Bethe, J. M. Dawson, and J. S. Su. "Nonlinear scattering of neutrinos by plasma waves: a ponderomotive force description", Phys. Lett. A 260, 107–110 (1996). SCI=71 (Source Google Scholar).
 A. A. Mamun, R. A. Cairns and P. K. Shukla. "Solitary potentials in dusty plasmas", Phys. Plasmas 3, 702–706 (1996). SCI=148 (Source Google Scholar).
 P. K. Shukla and N. N. Rao. "Coulomb crystallization in colloidal plasmas with streaming ions and dust grains", Phys. Plasmas 3, 1770–1772 (1996). SCI=80.
 A. A. Mamun, R. A. Cairns and P. K. Shukla. "Effects of vortex-like and nonthermal ion distributions on nonlinear dust acoustic waves", Phys. Plasmas 3, 2610–2614 (1996). SCI=223.
 S. I. Popel, S. V. Vladimirov and P. K. Shukla. "Ion-acoustic solitons in an electron-positron-ion plasma", Phys. Plasmas 2, 716–720 (1995). SCI=205.
 P. K. Shukla, G. Birk and Bingham. "Vortex streets driven by sheared flow and applications to black aurora", Geophys. Res. Lett. 22, 671–674, (1995). SCI=71.
 R. A. Cairns, A. A. Mamun, R. Bingham, R. Bostrom, R. O. Dendy, C. M. C. Nairns and P. K. Shukla. "Electrostatic solitary structures in nonthermal plasmas", Geophys. Res. Lett.' 22, 2709–2712 (1995). SCI=229.
 M. Nambu, and S. V. Vladimirov and P. K. Shukla. "Attractive forces between charged particulates in plasmas", Phys. Lett. A 203, 40–42 (1995). SCI= 192 (Source Google Scholar).
 P. K. Shukla and R. K. Varma. "Convective cells in nonuniform dusty plasmas", Phys. Fluids B 5, 236–237 (1993). SCI=87.
 R. K. Varma, P. K. Shukla and V. Krishan. "Electrostatic oscillations in the presence of grain charge perturbations in dusty plasmas", Phys. Rev. E 47, 3612–3616 (1993). SCI=306 (Source Google Scholar).
 P. K. Shukla. "Low-frequency modes in dusty plasmas", Physica Scripta 45, 504–507 (1992). SCI=212 (Source Google Scholar).
 P. K. Shukla and V. P. Silin. "Dust ion-acoustic wave", Physica Scripta 45, 508 (1992). SCI=641 (Source Google Scholar).
 P. K. Shukla, M. Y. Yu and R. Bharuthram. "Linear and nonlinear dust drift waves", J. Geophys. Res. 96, 21343–21346 (1991). SCI=129 (Source Google Scholar).
 N. N. Rao, P. K. Shukla and M. Y. Yu. "Dust-acoustic waves in dusty plasmas", Planet. Space Sci. 38, 543–546 (1990). SCI=12978(via Google Scholar). 
 P. K. Shukla, N. N. Rao, M. Y. Yu and N. L. Tsintsadze. "Relativistic nonlinear effects in plasmas", Phys. Rep. 138, 1–149 (1986). SCI=327 (Source Google Scholar).
 R. Bharuthram and P. K. Shukla. "Large amplitude ion-acoustic double layers in a double Maxwellian electron plasma", Phys. Fluids 29, 3214–3218 (1986). SCI=70.
 P. K. Shukla and L. Stenflo. "Nonlinear propagation of electromagnetic ion-cyclotron Alfven waves", Phys. Fluids 28, 1576–1578 (1985). SCI=62.
 P. K. Shukla, M. Y. Yu, H. U. Rahman and K. H. Spatschek. "Nonlinear convective motion in plasmas", Phys. Rep. 105, 227–228 (1984). SCI=81 (source Google Scholar). 
 G. Murtaza and P. K. Shukla. "Nonlinear generation of electromagnetic waves in a magnetoplasma", J. Plasma Phys. 31, 423–436 (1984). SCI=62.
 P. K. Shukla and L. Stenflo. "Nonlinear propagation of electromagnetic waves in magnetized plasmas", Phys. Rev. A 30, 2110–2112 (1984). SCI=71.
 P. K. Shukla and J. M. Dawson. "Stimulated Compton scattering of hydromagnetic waves in the interstellar medium", Astrophys. J. Lett. 276, L49–L51 (1984). SCI=12.
 R. P. Sharma and P. K. Shukla. "Nonlinear effects at the upper-hybrid layer", Phys. Fluids 26, 87–99 (1983). SCI=63.
 P. K. Shukla, H. U. Rahman and R. P. Sharma. "Alfven soliton in a low-beta plasma", J. Plasma Phys. 28, 125–127 (1982). SCI=64.
 P. K. Shukla. "Modulational instability of whistler-mode signals", Nature (London) 274, 874–875 (1978). SCI=26.
 M. Y. Yu and P. K. Shukla. "Finite amplitude solitary Alfven waves", Phys. Fluids 21, 1457–1458 (1978). SCI=68.
 P. K. Shukla and M. Y. Yu. "Exact solitary ion acoustic waves in a magnetoplasma", J. Math. Phys. 19, 2506–2508 (1978). SCI=104 (source Google Scholar).

Academic appointments
March 2012: Adjunct Physics Professor, Department of Physics & Astronomy, Delhi University, India
July 2011: Adjunct Professor of Engineering Sciences, Department of Mechanical and Aerospace Engineering, University of California San Diego (UCSD), La Jolla, California, USA
 July 2010: RUB International Chair (Distinguished Physics Professor), Faculty of Physics & Astronomy, Ruhr-University Bochum, Germany
 January 1973: Faculty member (Hon. Professor of Theoretical Physics, since 2006) in the Faculty of Physics and Astronomy, Ruhr-University Bochum, Germany
 2007: Honorary Professor at School of Physics, University of KwaZulu Natal (UKN), Durban, South Africa
 2006: Visiting professor at the Scottish Universities Physics Alliance (SUPA), Department of Physics, University of Strathclyde, Glasgow, UK
 2008: Chairman of the Scientific Council of the Emerging Nations Science Foundation, Trieste, Italy
 2008-2011: Chairman of IUPAP C.16 Commission on Plasma Physics
 2006–2008: Secretary of IUPAP C.16 Commission on Plasma Physics
 2004: Member of IoP Panel for electing IoP Fellows, IoP (London), UK
 2004: Invited Full Professor, Laser and Plasma Group/IPFN, Instituto Superior Tecnico, Technical University of Lisbon, Portugal
 2004: Fellow of STFC Center for Fundamental Physics, Rutherford Appleton Laboratory, UK
 2002-2011: Elected Member of the IUPAP C.16 Commission on Plasma Physics
 2000: Visiting professor at the ECE Dept. of UCSD La Jolla, California, US for one month each year
 1999: Associate Member of the Max-Planck Institut fuer extraterrestrische Physik, Garching, Germany
 1997: Visiting professor, Department of Physics, Umea University, Umea, Sweden

Professional distinctions and honors
 2013: Hind Rattan (The Jewel of India) Award of India
 2011 An APS Outstanding Referee, American Physical Society, USA
2010 Star Dust Award from the International Dusty Plasma Physics Community
 2009 Corresponding Fellow of the Royal Society of Edinburgh, Scotland, UK
 2009 Doctor Honoris Causa degree from the Technical University of Lisbon, Portugal
 2009 First Laureate of the 22nd Khwarizmi International Award from IROST, Iran
 2008 Foreign Member of The Royal Swedish Academy of Engineering Sciences
 2007 Associate Fellow/Member of Physics Class of The Academy of Sciences for the Developing World (TWAS), Trieste
 2006 Foreign Member of Physics Class of The Royal Swedish Academy of Sciences
 2006 Gay-Lussac-Humboldt-Prize from the French Ministry of Education and Research
 2005 APS Dwight Nicholson Medal for Human Outreach through Physics
 2005 Distinguished Guest (VIP) of the Abdus Salam ICTP, Trieste, Italy
 2005 ESA Certificate Award in Recognition of Outstanding Contribution to Cluster's Exploration of Geospace
 2004 Doctor Honoris Causa Degree from the Russian Academy of Sciences, Moscow, Russia
 2002 Fellow of the Institute of Physics (London), UK
 2001 Fellow of the American Physical Society (APS), USA
 1995 Japanese Society for Promotion of Science (JSPS) Fellowship from Japan

Membership and professional services
 Member of the AGU and APS (US), IoP (UK), Life Member of the Plasma Science Society of India, Member of IUPAP C.16 Commission on Plasma Physics, IoP panel
 Member for electing IoP Fellows, Physics panel member for electing TWAS Fellows, and Associate Member of the COSPAR (Committee on Space Research)
 Proposal Reviewer for NASA, DOE and NSF (US), ESF, Alexander von Humboldt Foundation (Germany), Israel Science Foundation, South African Science Foundation, British Research Council, Canadian Research Council, Swiss National Science Foundation ; Reviewer for more than 60 scientific journals, including Nature Physics, PRL, PRE, PRA, PoP, GRL, JGR, NPG, ApJ, APL, EPL, PLA, PPCF, NJP, JPP, etc.
 Co-organizer/director of many (more than 25) International Physics Conferences, as well as of Plasma Colleges & Plasma Workshops (e.g. at the Abdus Salam ICTP, Trieste, Italy) around the globe
 Advisory Board and Program Committee members of many (more than 60) International Plasma Physics Conferences
 External Examiners of many (more than 35) PhD theses in Europe, Africa & Asia
 Associate Member of the Max-Planck Institut fuer Extraterrestrische Physik, Garching bei Munchen, Germany
 Elected Member (1987–1995) of the Convent (Parliament) of Ruhr-Universitaet Bochum, Germany

Editorial activities
 Since 2005 editor-in-chief, Journal of Plasma Physics, Cambridge University Press, Cambridge, UK
 Since 2012 associate editor, Physics of Plasmas, American Institute of Physics, New York, USA
 Since 2012 editorial board member, Physical Review E, American Physical Society, New York, USA
 2004-2010 editorial board member, New J. Physics, Institute of Physics (IoP), Bristol, UK
 Since 2008 international advisory panel, Plasma Physics Controlled Fusion, IoP, Bristol, UK
 2000–2008 editorial board member, Plasma Physics Controlled Fusion, IoP, Bristol, UK
 1999–2008 associate editor, IEEE Trans. Plasma Science, USA
 1992–2004 associate editor, Journal of Plasma Physics, Cambridge University Press, UK
 1993–1998 editorial advisory board member, Planetary and Space Sci., Pergamon Press, UK

Professional responsibilities, scientific productivity and scientific impact
Since 2010 Founding Director of International Centre for Advanced Studies in Physical Sciences, Ruhr University Bochum, Germany
 Since 1995 co-director of Plasma Physics Activities, Abdus Salam ICTP, Trieste, Italy
 Since 2002 Member of the IAC of the International Congress on Plasma Physics
 Since 1996 Chairman IAC of the International Conference on the Physics of Dusty Plasmas
 Since 1995 Chairman of the International Topical Conference on Plasma Physics
 Supervised 30 postdoctoral associates and 6 PhD students
 1450 publications in international peer-reviewed journals (e.g. 2 Nature; 1 Nature Physics; 39 Phys. Rev. Lett.; 120 Phys. Rev. A, B, D, E; 360 Phys. Fluids & Phys. Plasmas; 200 J. Plasma Phys.; 200 Phys. Lett. A; 65 AGU journals)
 70 Review Articles (e.g. 3  Phys. Rep., 3  Rev. Mod. Phys., 1 Phys. Usp.)
 150 contributions in many International Conference Proceedings
 Textbook Introduction to Dusty Plasma Physics, P. K. Shukla and A. A. Mamun (IoP, Bristol, 2002)
 Dust Plasma Interaction in Space, Ed. P. K. Shukla (Nova, NY, 2002)
 Co-Editor: 14 books (9 AIP NY, 4 World Sci. Singapore,1 Elsevier), 14 Physica Scripta Topical Issues, and 3 Special Issues in Journals
 Invited speaker (Keynote Speeches; Plenary, Tutorial and Topical Talks) at more than 130 International Conferences worldwide
 Total Citations 1973-2011 (ISI-Web of Science):21.300+; without self-citation:15.600+, Hirsch (h)-index (h papers with h+citations):62 (via Web of Knowledge/Science)

Professional interests
 Basic physics of low- and high-temperature plasmas, with applications to space and laboratory
 Nonlinear quantum plasma physics
 Nonlinear space and astroplasmas
 Nonlinear processes in geophysical flows
 Collective interactions in dusty plasmas
 Intense laser-plasma interactions
 Plasma based high-energy charged particle acceleration
 Nonlinear photonics/optics

See also
Plasma (physics)
Dusty plasma

Further reading
 P. K. Shukla. "Discovery of the Dust Acoustic Wave", e.g. P. K. Shukla. "Nonlinear Effects in Dusty Plasmas" presented in Proceedings of the First Capri Workshop on Dusty Plasmas, 23 May 1989 – 2 June 1989'', Capri, Italy, Ed. C. Nappi, Consiglio Nazionale delle Aicerche Instituto di Cibernetica, Arco Felice, Napoli, Italy, 1989, pp. 38–39.

References

External links
 https://web.archive.org/web/20110611183404/http://www.tp4.rub.de/~ps/

1950 births
2013 deaths
20th-century Indian physicists
People from Mirzapur district
Banaras Hindu University alumni
Academic staff of Ruhr University Bochum
Indian emigrants to Germany
Plasma physicists
Scientists from Uttar Pradesh
Umeå University alumni
Fellows of the Institute of Physics
Fellows of the American Physical Society